The 1997 NCAA Division III Men's Ice Hockey Tournament was the culmination of the 1996–97 season, the 14th such tournament in NCAA history. It concluded with Middlebury defeating Wisconsin-Superior in the championship game 3-2. All Quarterfinals matchups were held at home team venues, while all succeeding games were played in Middlebury, Vermont.

The championship marked the third in a row for Middlebury.

Qualifying teams
The following teams qualified for the tournament. There were no automatic bids, however, conference tournament champions were given preferential consideration. No formal seeding was used while quarterfinal matches were arranged so that the road teams would have the shortest possible travel distances.

Format
The tournament featured three rounds of play. In the Quarterfinals, teams played a two-game series where the first team to reach 3 points was declared a winner (2 points for winning a game, 1 point each for tying). If both teams ended up with 2 points after the first two games a 20-minute mini-game used to determine a winner. Mini-game scores are in italics.  Beginning with the Semifinals all games became Single-game eliminations. The winning teams in the semifinals advanced to the National Championship Game with the losers playing in a Third Place game. The teams were seeded according to geographic proximity in the quarterfinals so the visiting team would have the shortest feasible distance to travel.

Bracket

Note: * denotes overtime period(s)Note: Mini-games in italics

Record by conference

References

External links
Division III Men's Ice Hockey Record Book

 
NCAA Division III ice hockey